Podkhuldochi (Khadkhaldochi) is a rural locality (a selo) in Dzhidinsky District, Republic of Buryatia, Russia. The population was 9 as of 2010.

Geography 
Podkhuldochi is located 62 km west of Petropavlovka (the district's administrative centre) by road. Armak is the nearest rural locality.

References 

Rural localities in Dzhidinsky District